Viktor Axelsen (born 4 January 1994) is a Danish badminton player. He is the reigning World and Olympic Champion in Men's singles, having won the 2022 World Championships and 2020 Olympics. 

He won the 2010 World Junior Championships, beating South Korea's Kang Ji-wook in the final to become the first ever European singles player to hold the title. Axelsen is a three-time European champion, having won the title in 2016, 2018 and 2022.

Early life 
Axelsen was born in Odense, and at six years old, his father introduced him to badminton, playing the games at the Odense badminton club. He lived with his father after his parents divorced, and then lived alone in Copenhagen at the age of 17 and joined the national team. His father Henrik Axelsen ran a small advertising agency for a number of years, but now works full time as a manager for his son, and his mother Gitte Lundager has a shop in central Odense with a hairdressing salon, cosmetics and fashion clothing. He was named as the 2004 Player of the Year by Odense badminton club.

Career

2006–2011: Early career and World Junior title 

Axelsen's achievements began when he won the National junior event in the boys' singles and doubles in his age group in 2006 and 2008. He later emerged victorious at the 2009 German Junior and also at the European U17 Championships. He made his debut in the senior international tournament at the 2009 Denmark Open playing in the men's doubles event with Steffen Rasmussen.

In January 2010, Axelsen who played from the qualification round, manage to reach the finals at the Swedish International tournament, and finished as the runner-up after losing to Indra Bagus Ade Chandra in straight games 15–21, 12–21. He competed at the World Junior Championships in Guadalajara, Mexico, claimed the boys' singles title by defeating the No.1 seed, China's Huang Yuxiang in the quarter-finals, India's B. Sai Praneeth in the semis and Kang Ji-wook of Korea in the final. In October, he claimed his first international senior title at the age of just sixteen, winning the Cyprus International. A few weeks later he entered his first Super Series event in singles, the 2010 Denmark Open; making it through the qualifying stages before losing out to compatriot and eventual winner Jan Ø. Jørgensen in the second round.

In 2011, Axelsen secured gold at the European Junior Championships, defeating teammate Rasmus Fladberg 21–8, 17–21, 21–13 in the final. He took a silver medal at the 2011 BWF World Junior Championships, losing the title to Malaysia's Zulfadli Zulkiffli, coming in second place.

2012–2014: First Grand Prix title, European and World bronze 
In early 2012, Axelsen moved to Valby, in Copenhagen, and started training at Brøndby elite center. Axelsen finished runner-up at the French Open in Paris, losing in the final to Liew Daren 18–21, 17–21. He also won a bronze medal at the 2012 European Championships, losing the semi-final in three games to Sweden's Henri Hurskainen 21–18, 18–21, 17–21.

In 2014, Axelsen won his first Grand Prix title at the Swiss Open, beating China's Tian Houwei in the final 21–7, 16–21, 25–23. Axelsen won a bronze medal at the 2014 BWF World Championships and also a bronze medal again at the 2014 European Championships.

2015–2016: European champion, Olympic bronze, and Superseries title 
In 2015, Axelsen finished runners-up at the Swiss Open Grand Prix Gold, and three Super Series events: India Open, Australian Open, and Japan Open. He qualified to compete at the Super Series Finals held in Dubai, and again finished as the runner-up. Axelsen featured in Denmark's winning team at the European Mixed Team Championships in Leuven, Belgium. At the Sudirman Cup, the team finished in the quarter finals lost 2–3 to Japanese team, where he played in the second matches. He ended the 2015 season ranked as world number 6.

In 2016, Axelsen earned his first European crown in May 2016, beating compatriot and defending champion Jan Ø. Jørgensen with 21–11, 21–16 in the final of the 25th edition of the European Championships, the first in France at La Roche-sur-Yon. He was also part of the historic Danish team winning the first ever Thomas Cup title in 2016. Axelsen won five of his six played singles matches in the team tournament, including the match against Indonesia's experienced player Tommy Sugiarto in the final (21–17, 21–18) setting up a dramatic and historic 3–2 victory for Denmark over Indonesia. In the 2016 Rio Olympics, he won the bronze medal by beating Lin Dan from China 21–15, 12–21, 21–17.

2017: World champion, second Superseries Finals title, World number 1 
In 2017, Axelsen won the World Championships in Glasgow in straight games against Lin Dan (22–20, 21–16) and became the third Danish player to ever become a world champion (Peter Rasmussen 1997 in Glasgow & Flemming Delfs 1977 in Sweden).  Axelsen, with a record of 4–3, is the only top twenty player to hold a winning record against Lin Dan, head-to-head.

Axelsen followed up his victory in Glasgow by winning the finals of the Japan Open tournament in Tokyo over Lee Chong Wei of Malaysia in three sets on 23 September, propelling him to the top of the BWF World Rankings.

2018–2019: Second European Championships title 
In 2018, Axelsen participated in the European Men's and Women's Team Badminton Championships and got a gold after suffering from a foot injury. He represented Denmark in the 2018 Thomas & Uber Cup. In the group stage, he defeated Vladimir Malkov from Russia and from Algeria. In the group stage match against Lee Chong Wei, he lost by two straight games 9–21, 19–21. In the quarter-finals match against South Korea, he defeated Son Wan-ho, but he lost to the favorite and former world no. 2, Kento Momota in semi-finals. Denmark was then eliminated in semi-finals and failed to defend the title in the 2016 event. In August, Axelsen was unable to defend his world title where he was defeated by two-time World Champion and reigning Olympic Champion Chen Long in the quarter-finals.

2020: All England Open title 
Axelsen started the season by competing in the Indonesia Masters. He finished as the semi-finalist after losing to home player the seventh seed Anthony Sinisuka Ginting in two straight games. In February, he managed to defend his title in the Barcelona Spain Masters after beating the Thai youngster Kunlavut Vitidsarn in straight games 21–16, 21–13. In March, he won the All England Open, making history as the first European and Dane to lift the men's singles trophy since 1999.

2021: Olympic gold, first Denmark Open title and "Male Player Of The Year" award 
Axelsen participated at the European Mixed Team Championships in Finland, and helped the team to win the gold medal. In March, Axelsen entered the All England Open as the defending champion. He reached the final, but lost to 6th seed Lee Zii Jia of Malaysia in a grueling 3-game match (29–30, 22–20, 9–21). He then took part at the Kyiv European Championships, advanced to the final, but the organizers decided to cancel the finals, since Axelsen tested positive for COVID-19. Consequently, he was barred from playing the final match with his compatriot Anders Antonsen and was awarded a silver medal. He won the gold medal in the 2020 Olympic Games in Tokyo, Japan, beating the defending champion Chen Long in straight games in the final and without dropping a single game in the entire tournament.

In October, he won the Denmark Open title, defeating the top seed and world no.1 Kento Momota in a thrilling final match in three games. The match lasted 93 minutes. This was Axelsen's only second ever victory over Momota in their sixteen encounters. He then won his second super 1000 title of the year at the Indonesian Open by beating Singapore's Loh Kean Yew. For his achievements, Axelsen regain the number 1 spot at the BWF World ranking and have been named the 2020/2021 BWF Male Player of the Year. He then won the season ending of the 2021 BWF World Tour Finals, beating the current Eddy Chong Most Promising Player, Kunlavut Vitidsarn in the final in straight games, adding another victory to his undeniably successful year.

The following month, Axelsen crashed out in the first round to the eventual World Champion Loh Kean Yew in the World Championships, losing 21–14, 9–21, 6–21 in 54 minutes.

2022: Second World Championship title and "Male Player of The Year" award 
Axelsen started the 2022 season as the world number one on the BWF World Ranking. He reached the semi-finals of the German Open 2022 where he narrowly lost in three games (13–21, 21–12, 20–22) to Indian player Lakshya Sen.

On March 20, Axelsen won the All England Open in convincing fashion without dropping a single game in the entire tournament. He defeated Lakshya Sen in the finals (21–10, 21–15).

On 30 April, Axelsen won his third European Championship by defeating compatriot Anders Antonsen, 21–17, 21–15, in Madrid, Spain. He joined Flemming Delfs, Poul-Erik Høyer and Peter Gade as Danish three-time winners in men's singles. Despite the win, Axelsen was not satisfied with the win, saying that there were many silly mistakes from both players.

On July 3, Axelsen won the Malaysia Open for the first time by defeating Kento Momota 21–4, 21–7 in the final, becoming the first Dane to win the event in 15 years. The next day, Axelsen withdrew from the 2022 Malaysia Masters, which was the next event on the tour. Axelsen then withdrew from the Singapore Open, taking a break in Singapore before moving on to the World Championships in August.

In August, Axelsen won the World Championships, defeating Thailand's three-time world junior champion Kunlavut Vitidsarn in the final, 21–5, 21–16. This was a second world championships title for Axelsen, adding on to the gold medal he won in 2017.

In mid October, Axelsen took part in his home event as the defending champion, the Denmark Open. In the quarterfinals, he lost to his training partner and former world champion Loh Kean Yew in a tame defeat, losing 17–21, 10–21 in just 30 minutes. Prior to this match, Axelsen had held a 39 match-winning streak, and his only loss in 2022 so far was to a narrow loss to Lakshya Sen in the German Open semi-final. After the match, Axelsen declared that he did not play up to his usual standard, going as far to describe his own play as "embarrassing", apologizing to the home crowd for his performance in the interview.

However, he won the French Open title, a week after the Denmark Open. He defeated Rasmus Gemke in the final, in straight games 21-14 21-15, without dropping a game in the entire tournament. For his amazing performance in this year, only losing two completed matches, he was crowned as the BWF Male Player Of The Year, for the 2nd time after winning it last year. In the World Tour Finals, which had initially been scheduled in Guangzhou but was later moved to Bangkok, number one seed Axelsen went on to become champion after defeating Anthony Sinisuka Ginting in straight sets, 21-13 21-14, ending 2022 with year-end number 1 ranking, 6 titles, and only 3 losses (out of 55 matches).

2023: Continued domination, BWF World Tour Super 1000 title 
In the first tournament of the year - Malaysia Open, Axelsen had no trouble defending his championship after defeating Rasmus Gemke, Liew Daren, Kenta Nishimoto, and finalist Kodai Naraoka losing only one game in the first round.

Personal life 
In addition to his native Danish, Axelsen is also a fluent speaker of English and Mandarin, giving himself a Chinese name of 安賽龍.

In August 2021 Axelsen decided to leave the Danish national team in Copenhagen and move with his family from Denmark to Dubai. There he could train at the NAS Sports Complex (Nad Al Sheba Sports Complex). Axelsen himself stated several reasons for the move to Dubai; for instance shorter travel time to most events in Asia, which allows him more remaining time to rest or warm-up. Another reason was the health factor since he suffers from asthma and acute rhinitis. This makes it more comfortable in Asia than in Europe, especially Denmark, which tends to be cooler and where his allergy can be triggered faster by things such as flower pollen, dust, or animal dander. And the other reason is the family factor. Axelsen wants to have more time with his family.

Axelsen's girlfriend, Natalia Koch Rohde, gave birth to a baby girl named Vega Rohde Axelsen on 15 October 2020. On 7 October 2022 she gave birth to her second baby girl named Aya Rohde Axelsen. Her father Henrik Rohde, who was headcoach of the winning Skovshoved team in the Danish league in 2017, since moving to Dubai, is also helping with the coaching  of her husband Viktor Axelsen.

Achievements

Olympic Games 
Men's singles

BWF World Championships 
Men's singles

European Championships 
Men's singles

BWF World Junior Championships 
Boys' singles

European Junior Championships 
Boys' singles

BWF World Tour (18 titles, 6 runners-up) 
The BWF World Tour, which was announced on 19 March 2017 and implemented in 2018, is a series of elite badminton tournaments sanctioned by the Badminton World Federation (BWF). The BWF World Tour is divided into levels of World Tour Finals, Super 1000, Super 750, Super 500, Super 300, and the BWF Tour Super 100.

Men's singles

BWF Superseries (4 titles, 7 runners-up) 
The BWF Superseries, which was launched on 14 December 2006 and implemented in 2007, was a series of elite badminton tournaments, sanctioned by the Badminton World Federation (BWF). BWF Superseries levels were Superseries and Superseries Premier. A season of Superseries consisted of twelve tournaments around the world that had been introduced since 2011. Successful players were invited to the Superseries Finals, which were held at the end of each year.

Men's singles

  Superseries Finals tournament
  Superseries Premier tournament
  Superseries tournament

BWF Grand Prix (1 title, 1 runner-up) 
The BWF Grand Prix had two levels, the Grand Prix and Grand Prix Gold. It was a series of badminton tournaments sanctioned by the Badminton World Federation (BWF) and played between 2007 and 2017.

Men's singles

  BWF Grand Prix Gold tournament
  BWF Grand Prix tournament

BWF International Challenge/Series (4 titles, 2 runners-up) 
Men's singles

  BWF International Challenge tournament
  BWF International Series tournament

Performance timeline

National team 
 Junior level

 Senior level

Individual competitions 
 Junior level

 Senior level

Career overview

Record against selected opponents 
Record against Year-end Finals finalists, World Championships semi-finalists, and Olympic quarter-finalists. Accurate as of 21 January 2023.

References

External links 
 
 
  (in English)
 Profile at BadmintonEurope.com

1994 births
Living people
Sportspeople from Odense
Danish male badminton players
Badminton players at the 2016 Summer Olympics
Badminton players at the 2020 Summer Olympics
Olympic badminton players of Denmark
Olympic gold medalists for Denmark
Olympic bronze medalists for Denmark
Olympic medalists in badminton
Medalists at the 2016 Summer Olympics
Medalists at the 2020 Summer Olympics
World No. 1 badminton players